On November 2, 2018, masked gunmen opened fire on a group of Egyptian Christians traveling by bus through Minya. There was a convoy of three vehicles and two of them managed to escape. The vehicles were carrying Copts traveling from Sohag Governorate and Minya Governorate in Egypt to the Monastery of Saint Samuel the Confessor. At least 7 people from Minya were killed while 12 others were injured. A similar attack near the same place had happened in 2017.

Background 

Copts have faced growing persecution and sectarian violence in Egypt since the early 2010s, including several in the last two years, all claimed by the Islamic State.

A similar attack happened on 26 May 2017, when masked gunman opened fire on a convoy carrying Copts in the same route of this attack, killing 29 people and wounding 22 others.

On 29 December 2017, a gunman killed at least 11 people in attacks on a Coptic Orthodox church and a Christian-owned shop near Cairo before he was wounded and arrested.

On 9 April 2017, Palm Sunday, terrorists bombed two Coptic churches — St. George's Church in the northern Egyptian city of Tanta on the Nile delta, and Saint Mark's Coptic Orthodox Cathedral, the principal church in Alexandria — killing 47 people and injuring at least 126 others.

On 11 December 2016, a suicide bomber killed 29 people and injured 47 others at St. Peter and St. Paul's Church (commonly known as El-Botroseya Church)

Attack
On 2 November 2018, three buses left Monastery of Saint Samuel the Confessor carrying Coptic Christians on their way to Minya. The Buses were ambushed by Islamic state fighters around Minya. During the ambush, the first two buses managed to escape with 12 injured passengers however the third bus was unable to escape the ambush and was forced to come to a stop. Seven civilians on board the bus were killed.

Response and reactions

Two days later, 19 militants involved in the attack were killed in a shoot-out with the police.

Pope Francis prayed for the victims in his Sunday Angelus Address, subsequent to the killings.

See also 

 2011 Alexandria bombing
 2011 Imbaba church attacks
 Botroseya Church bombing
 Christianity in Egypt
 Coptic Orthodox Church
 Kosheh massacres
 Nag Hammadi massacre
 2017 Minya attack
 Persecution of Copts

References 

2018 murders in Africa
November 2018 crimes in Africa
November 2018 events in Egypt
Improvised explosive device bombings in Egypt
ISIL terrorist incidents in Egypt
Islamic terrorist incidents in 2018
Massacres of Christians
Massacres in religious buildings and structures
Massacres in 2018
Massacres in Egypt
Mass shootings in Egypt
Persecution of Copts by ISIL
Religiously motivated violence in Egypt
Terrorist incidents in Egypt in 2018
2018 attack
Mass murder in 2018
Attacks in Egypt in 2018